Richard Ely Peterson (July 17, 1920 – December 21, 2009) was an American politician.

Born in Waupaca, Wisconsin, Peterson served in the United States Army, in the 32nd Infantry Division, of the Wisconsin Army National Guard, during World War II. He served in the Wisconsin State Assembly 1951-1965 as a Republican and practiced law. He received his bachelor's degree and law degrees from what is now the University of Wisconsin–Madison and the University of Wisconsin Law School. Later he served as family court commissioner and he and his wife open an antique store.

Notes

1920 births
2009 deaths
People from Waupaca, Wisconsin
University of Wisconsin–Madison alumni
University of Wisconsin Law School alumni
Wisconsin lawyers
Military personnel from Wisconsin
United States Army personnel of World War II
Republican Party members of the Wisconsin State Assembly
20th-century American politicians
20th-century American lawyers
Wisconsin National Guard personnel